Mesophleps nairobiensis is a moth of the family Gelechiidae. It is found in Ivory Coast, Sierra Leone, Mozambique, Uganda and Kenya.

The wingspan is 8.5–17 mm. The forewings are off-white with a small group of black scales towards the apex. The costal margin is edged by dark blackish brown. The hindwings are dark grey.

References

Moths described in 1995
Mesophleps